The 1997–98 Los Angeles Kings season was the Kings' 31st season in the National Hockey League. The Kings qualified for the playoffs for the first time in five years, losing in the first round to St. Louis in four straight games.

Offseason

Regular season

On Saturday, April 11, 1998, the Kings scored three short-handed goals in 4-3 win over the Colorado Avalanche.

Final standings

Schedule and results

Playoffs
The Kings were swept by the St. Louis Blues in 4 games in the first round. At home (game 3) LA were leading 3-0, until Storr was run by Geoff Courtnall with 11:27 remaining in the 3rd period. Kings player Sean O'Donnell stuck up for Storr resulting in a 5-minute major for the Blues. St. Louis went on to score 4 PP goals in a 3:07 span. Jamie likely had a concussion or some injury from the charge as his reactions and play were sluggishly uncoordinated contributing to the goals especially the 4th one.

Player statistics

Awards and records

Transactions
The Kings were involved in the following transactions during the 1997–98 season.

Trades

Free agent signings

Free agents lost

Draft picks
Los Angeles's draft picks at the 1997 NHL Entry Draft held at the Civic Arena in Pittsburgh, Pennsylvania.

See also
1997–98 NHL season

References
 

L
L
Los Angeles Kings seasons
LA Kings
LA Kings